Summercamp Nightmare is the second studio album by the band 3 released in 2003.

Overview
The band decided they wanted to record the entire record without the use of computers or digital recording technology, so it was recorded entirely to analog tape.
Some of the tracks that appear on this album had previously been included on the band's live album Half Life, while "Dregs" and "Amaze Disgrace" were later featured again on next band's album Wake Pig, most notably "Amaze Disgrace", which has appeared on three of the band's albums as well as Joey Eppard's first solo album Been to the Future.

Track listing

Personnel
3
Lead vocals & Guitar — Joey Eppard
Guitars — Billy Riker
Bass Guitar — Joe Cuchelo
Keys/Percussion — Joe Stote
Drums — Chris "Gartdrumm" Gartmann

Additional
Executive producer — Tom Benton
Cover art by Joey Eppard
Back insert photo by Allison Braun
Insert photos by Molly Rubin
Graphics by The Turning Mill
Mastered at The Clubhouse, Rhinebeck, New York by Paul Antonell and Sean Price
"Dregs" and "Amaze Disgrace" recorded at The Temple of Stote, produced by Joey Eppard, engineered and mixed by Robert Frazza
All other songs recorded at IIWII studios in Weehawken, NJ, produced by Robert "Chicken" Burke, engineered by Sal Mormando, and mixed by Sal Mormando, Joey Eppard, and Robert "Chicken" Burke

References

2003 albums
3 (American band) albums